Jim Demonakos (born 1977) is an American director, graphic novelist, musician and event organizer noted for his work in comic books, conventions, and documentary films. He is most often noted as the founder of Emerald City Comic Con and co-founder of Lightbox Expo.

Early life
The child of Greek immigrants, Demonakos was born September 21, 1977  in Seattle, Washington.

He graduated in 1996, and attended The Art Institute of Seattle in Seattle, Wa. Soon after he opened his first comic shop, and has remained in the comic book and pop culture event industry for two decades.

Career

Jim Demonakos is the founder of Seattle's Emerald City Comic Con which started asa one-day event at the Qwest Field Events Center in 2003 and broke even with an attendance of 3,000 people. He then spent 15 years developing Emerald City Comic Con into what was the largest independent comic convention in the US, with attendance topping 100,000.

After the show was acquired by ReedPOP, Demonakos worked on events around the world including New York Comic Con, Star Wars Celebration, Oz Comic Con and Comic Con Paris before founding LightBox Expo, a convention for animation, illustration and concept art , that debuted in 2019.

He is also the writer of the New York Times Best Selling graphic novel, The Silence of Our Friends, co-written alongside Mark Long and illustrated by National Book Award winner Nate Powell.

Alongside Kyle Stevens, he co-founded and was a songwriter for the pioneering nerd rock band Kirby Krackle.

Most recently, he was one of two directors (alongside Kevin Konrad Hanna) of Mike Mignola: Drawing Monsters, a feature length, award-winning documentary about Mike Mignola and the creation of his comic book universe centered around Hellboy.

Personal life
Jim Demonakos lives with his wife in Mukilteo, Washington.

Film credits
 Mike Mignola: Drawing Monsters (2022) – director/producer

Bibliography

The Silence Of Our Friends (art by Nate Powell written by Mark Long and Jim Demonakos. 1/12, Image Comics)
SKULLKICKERS #12 (art by Joel Carroll written by Jim Demonakos, Kyle Stevens, Howard Tayler, Zach Weiner, and Jim Zub. 1/12, First Second Books)
Shrapnel (Radical Comics) No. 1 – #5 edited by Jim Demonakos. 1/12, Image Comics)

Awards 
 2022: FilmQuest Film Festival: Best Documentary for "Mike Mignola: Drawing Monsters" with collaborator Kevin Konrad Hanna
 2022: Gen Con Film Festival: Best Documentary for "Mike Mignola: Drawing Monsters" 
 2022: Chagrin Documentary Film Festival: Best Documentary for "Mike Mignola: Drawing Monsters" 
 2022: Fantasmagoria: Best Documentary for "Mike Mignola: Drawing Monsters" 
 2022: Prague Independent Film Festival: Best Documentary for "Mike Mignola: Drawing Monsters"

References

External links

 Emerald City Comic Con

American cartoonists
1977 births
American graphic novelists
American male novelists
Living people
Artists from Seattle
Filmmakers from Seattle
Musicians from Seattle
Writers from Seattle